The Blackshape Prime is an Italian ultralight aircraft, produced by Blackshape srl, the company founded in Monopoli by Luciano Belviso and Angelo Petrosillo. The aircraft first flew in 2007 and was introduced at the Aero show held in Friedrichshafen in 2009. It is supplied as a complete ready-to-fly-aircraft.

Design and development
The Prime started as the Millennium Master, but the design was later acquired and further developed by Blackshape. The aircraft was designed to comply with the Fédération Aéronautique Internationale microlight rules. It features a cantilever low-wing, a two-seats-in-tandem enclosed cockpit under a bubble canopy, retractable tricycle landing gear and a single engine in tractor configuration.

The aircraft is made from pre-preg carbon fibre. The  Rotax 914 is also available as an option.

Specifications (Prime)

See also

References

External links

Official video

2000s Italian ultralight aircraft
Homebuilt aircraft
Single-engined tractor aircraft